Tápiószentmárton is a village in Pest county, Hungary.

Locate 
It can be approached by the main road no. 4. The most practical way to get there is using the Budapest-Újszász-Szolnok train line. Travel to Nagykáta, then with bus. Tápiószentmárton has its own train station, but it is far away from the central.

References 

Populated places in Pest County